Breanne Nicholas is a Canadian rugby sevens player. She won a gold medal at the 2019 Pan American Games as a member of the Canada women's national rugby sevens team.

In June 2021, Nicholas was named to Canada's 2020 Summer Olympics team. She also competed for Canada at the 2022 Rugby World Cup Sevens in Cape Town. They placed sixth overall after losing to Fiji in the fifth place final.

References

1994 births
Living people
Canada international rugby sevens players
Female rugby sevens players
Rugby sevens players at the 2019 Pan American Games
Pan American Games gold medalists for Canada
Pan American Games medalists in rugby sevens
Medalists at the 2019 Pan American Games
Rugby sevens players at the 2020 Summer Olympics
Olympic rugby sevens players of Canada
Canada international women's rugby sevens players
20th-century Canadian women
21st-century Canadian women
Rugby sevens players at the 2022 Commonwealth Games